Barra do Corda is a municipality in the state of Maranhão in the Northeast region of Brazil.

Climate

Higher Education 
Logos Institute of Theology (Instituto Logos de Teologia)

See also 
List of municipalities in Maranhão

References 

Municipalities in Maranhão